Red Hot Hoofs is a 1926 American silent Western film directed by Robert De Lacey and starring Tom Tyler, Frankie Darro and Dorothy Dunbar.

Cast
 Tom Tyler as Tom Buckley 
 Frankie Darro as Frankie Buckley 
 Dorothy Dunbar as Frances Morris 
 Stanley Taylor as Gerald Morris 
 Harry O'Connor as Jim Morris 
 Al Kaufman as Battling Jack Riley 
 Barney Furey as Al Skelly

References

Bibliography
 Darby, William. Masters of Lens and Light: A Checklist of Major Cinematographers and Their Feature Films. Scarecrow Press, 1991.

External links
 

1926 films
1926 Western (genre) films
Films directed by Robert De Lacey
Film Booking Offices of America films
American black-and-white films
Silent American Western (genre) films
1920s English-language films
1920s American films